The 2008 Tour Féminin en Limousin was the 4th edition of the Tour Féminin en Limousin, a women's cycling stage race in France. It was rated by the UCI as category 2.2 race, and was held between 24 and 27 July 2008.

Stages

Stage 1
24 July 2008 – Limoges to Landouge, Individual time trial

Stage 2
25 July 2008 – Chassenon to Chassenon,

Stage 3
26 July 2008 – Lauriere to Lauriere,

Stage 4
27 July 2008 – Ste Feyre to Ste Feyre,

Final classifications

General classification

Source

Points classification

Source

Mountains classification

Source

Youth classification

Source

See also
 2008 in women's road cycling

References

External links

Tour Feminin en Limousin
Tour Féminin en Limousin
Tour Feminin en Limousin
Tour Feminin en Limousin